The Copper Age, also called the Chalcolithic (from  khalkós, "copper" and  líthos, "stone") or (A)eneolithic (from Latin aeneus "of copper"), is an archaeological period characterized by regular human manipulation of copper, but prior to the discovery of bronze alloys.  Modern researchers consider the period as a subset of the broader Neolithic, but earlier scholars defined it as a transitional period between the Neolithic and the Bronze Age.

The transition from Copper Age to Bronze Age in Europe occurred between the late 5th and the late  In the Ancient Near East the Copper Age covered about the same period, beginning in the late  and lasting for about a millennium before it gave rise to the Early Bronze Age.

Terminology

The multiple names result from multiple definitions of the period. Originally, the term Bronze Age meant that either copper or bronze was being used as the chief hard substance for the manufacture of tools and weapons. Ancient writers, who provided the essential cultural references for educated people during the 19th century, used the same name for both copper- and bronze-using ages.

In 1881, John Evans recognized that use of copper often preceded the use of bronze, and distinguished between a transitional Copper Age and the Bronze Age proper. He did not include the transitional period in the Bronze Age, but described it separately from the customary stone / bronze / iron system, at the Bronze Age's beginning. He did not, however, present it as a fourth age but chose to retain the tripartite system.

In 1884, Gaetano Chierici, perhaps following the lead of Evans, renamed it in Italian as the eneo-litica, or "bronze–stone" transition. The phrase was never intended to mean that the period was the only one in which both bronze and stone were used. The Copper Age features the use of copper, excluding bronze; moreover, stone continued to be used throughout both the Bronze Age and the Iron Age. The part -litica simply names the Stone Age as the point from which the transition began and is not another -lithic age.

Subsequently, British scholars used either Evans's "Copper Age" or the term "Eneolithic" (or Æneolithic), a translation of Chierici's eneo-litica. After several years, a number of complaints appeared in the literature that "Eneolithic" seemed to the untrained eye to be produced from e-neolithic, "outside the Neolithic", clearly not a definitive characterization of the Copper Age. Around 1900, many writers began to substitute Chalcolithic for Eneolithic, to avoid the false segmentation.

But "chalcolithic" could also mislead: For readers unfamiliar with the Italian language, chalcolithic seemed to suggest another -lithic age, paradoxically part of the Stone Age despite the use of copper. Today, Copper Age, Eneolithic, and Chalcolithic are used synonymously
to mean Evans's original definition of Copper Age.

Near East

The emergence of metallurgy may have occurred first in the Fertile Crescent. The earliest use of lead is documented here from the late Neolithic settlement of Yarim Tepe in Iraq,

The earliest lead (Pb) finds in the ancient Near East are a  bangle from Yarim Tepe in northern Iraq and a slightly later conical lead piece from Halaf period Arpachiyah, near Mosul. As native lead is extremely rare, such artifacts raise the possibility that lead smelting may have begun even before copper smelting.

Copper smelting is also documented at this site at about the same time period (soon after 6000 BC), although the use of lead seems to precede copper smelting. Early metallurgy is also documented at the nearby site of Tell Maghzaliyah, which seems to be dated even earlier, and completely lacks pottery.

The Timna Valley contains evidence of copper mining in 7000–5000 BC. The process of transition from Neolithic to Chalcolithic in the Middle East is characterized in archaeological stone tool assemblages by a decline in high quality raw material procurement and use. This dramatic shift is seen throughout the region, including the Tehran Plain, Iran. Here, analysis of six archaeological sites determined a marked downward trend in not only material quality, but also in aesthetic variation in the lithic artefacts. Fazeli & Coningham use these results as evidence of the loss of craft specialisation caused by increased use of copper tools. The Tehran Plain findings illustrate the effects of the introduction of copper working technologies on the in-place systems of lithic craft specialists and raw materials. Networks of exchange and specialized processing and production that had evolved during the Neolithic seem to have collapsed by the Middle Chalcolithic and been replaced by the use of local materials by a primarily household-based production of stone tools.

Europe

A copper axe found at Prokuplje, Serbia contains the oldest securely dated evidence of coppermaking,  (7,500 years ago). The find in June 2010 extends the known record of copper smelting by about 800 years, and suggests that copper smelting may have been invented in separate parts of Asia and Europe at that time rather than spreading from a single source.

Knowledge of the use of copper was far more widespread than the metal itself. The European Battle Axe culture used stone axes modeled on copper axes, even with moulding carved in the stone. Ötzi the Iceman, who was found in the Ötztal Alps in 1991 and whose remains have been dated to about 3300 BC, was found with a Mondsee copper axe.

Examples of Chalcolithic cultures in Europe include Vila Nova de São Pedro and Los Millares on the Iberian Peninsula. Pottery of the Beaker people has been found at both sites, dating to several centuries after copper-working began there. The Beaker culture appears to have spread copper and bronze technologies in Europe, along with Indo-European languages.

South Asia

Ceramic similarities between the Indus Valley civilisation, southern Turkmenistan, and northern Iran during 4300–3300 BC of the Chalcolithic period suggest considerable mobility and trade.

The term "Chalcolithic" has also been used in the context of the South Asian Stone Age.

In Bhirrana, the earliest Indus civilization site, copper bangles and arrowheads were found. The inhabitants of Mehrgarh in present-day Pakistan fashioned tools with local copper ore between 7000 and 3300 BC.

The Nausharo site was a pottery workshop in province of Balochistan, Pakistan, that dates to 4,500 years ago; 12 blades and blade fragments were excavated there. Archaeological experiments show that these blades were made with a copper indenter and functioned as a potter's tool to trim and shape unfired pottery. Petrographic analysis indicates local pottery manufacturing, but also reveals the existence of a few exotic black-slipped pottery items from the Indus Valley.

In India, Chalcolithic culture flourished in mainly four farming communities – Ahar or Banas, Kayatha, Malwa, and Jorwe. These communities had some common traits like painted pottery and use of copper, but they had a distinct ceramic design tradition. Banas culture (2000–1600 BC) had ceramics with red, white, and black design. Kayatha culture (2450–1700 BC) had ceramics painted with brown colored design. Malwa culture (1900–1400 BC) had profusely decorated pottery with red or black colored design. Jorwe culture (1500–900 BC) had ceramics with matte surface and black-on-red design.

In March 2018, archaeologists had  discovered three carts and copper artifacts including weapons dating to 1800 BC in Sanauli village of Uttar Pradesh. The artifacts belongs to Ochre Coloured Pottery culture.

Pre-Columbian Americas

Andean civilizations in South America appear to have independently invented copper smelting.

The term "Chalcolithic"  is also applied to American civilizations that already used copper and copper alloys thousands of years before Europeans immigrated. Besides cultures in the Andes and Mesoamerica, the Old Copper Complex mined and fabricated copper as tools, weapons, and personal ornaments in an area centered in the upper Great Lakes region: Present-day Michigan and Wisconsin. The evidence of smelting or alloying that has been found in North America is subject to some dispute and a common assumption by archaeologists is that objects were cold-worked into shape. Artifacts from some of these sites have been dated to 6500–1000 BC, making them some of the oldest Chalcolithic sites in the world. Furthermore, some archaeologists find artifactual and structural evidence of casting by Hopewellian and Mississippian peoples to be demonstrated in the archaeological record.

East Asia

In the 5th millennium BC copper artifacts start to appear in East Asia, such as in the Jiangzhai and Hongshan cultures, but those metal artifacts were not widely used during this early stage.

Copper manufacturing gradually appeared in the Yangshao period (5000–3000 BC). Jiangzhai is the only site where copper artifacts were found in the Banpo culture. Archaeologists have found remains of copper metallurgy in various cultures from the late fourth to the early third millennia BC. These include the copper-smelting remains and copper artifacts of the Hongshan culture (4700–2900) and copper slag at the Yuanwozhen site. This indicates that inhabitants of the Yellow River valley had already learned how to make copper artifacts by the later Yangshao period.

Sub-Saharan Africa

In the region of the Aïr Mountains, Niger, independent copper smelting developed between 3000 and 2500 BC. The process was not in a developed state, indicating smelting was not foreign. It became mature about 1500 BC.

See also
 Proto-city

Footnotes

References

Sources

External links

 

 
Copper
Historical eras